Sir David Robert Macgowan Chapman, 3rd Baronet  (16 December 1941) is a British businessman and investment banker, and Deputy Lieutenant for the county of Tyne and Wear.

Early life
Chapman was born in Cleadon in County Durham (now Tyne and Wear) to Sir Robert Macgowan Chapman and Barbara May Tonks.

Later life
Chapman inherited the Chapman baronetcy after the death of his father Sir Robert Macgowan Chapman on 2 August 1987. He was appointed High Sheriff of Tyne and Wear for 1993-1994, and in 1997 was appointed Deputy Lieutenant of Tyne and Wear.

Honours
2 August 1987: Baronet, 3rd Baronet Chapman of Cleadon

Arms

References 

1941 births
High Sheriffs of Tyne and Wear
Baronets in the Baronetage of the United Kingdom
Deputy Lieutenants of Tyne and Wear
Living people
Chapman baronets